Marie Porter  (born 4 November 1939) is a researcher, writer and advocate for the welfare of women and children. She founded the Australian Motherhood Initiative for Research and Community Involvement (AMIRCI) in 2001. In her role as founder and chairperson of AMIRCI, Porter has presided over multiple international conferences held in Australia. These events are attended by a network of academics, postgraduate students, artists, health professionals and lawyers.

Porter has also been an active advocate in the field of  disability and was instrumental in the establishment of several organisations focused on the severely physically disabled including Friends of Brain Injured Children in 1977, the  Mamre Association  (respite  care for  parents  of disabled people) in 1983 and NIRAN Inc  (permanent  residential accommodation  for  severely disabled adults) in 1990.

Education and career 
Porter originally trained as a teacher and worked in education until she was forced to resign in 1962 as a result of the marriage bar. Over several decades Dr Porter was then primary carer for her severely physically disabled son with fragile health. During this period she completed her Bachelor of Arts. Porter has described her struggles during this time:

After completing her Phd she continued her research and lecturing. She organised the inaugural course on motherhood at the University of Queensland : HUMN2001: The Mother: Images, Issues and Practices. Porter's 2008 publication, ‘’Transformative Power in Motherwork’’, was based on her 2006 PhD thesis, which received the Dean's commendation from the University of Queensland. Since then she has published numerous texts on motherhood and has lectured internationally on this topic. Through setting up of AMIRCI she has provided an avenue for many others to present and publish research in this emerging field.

Awards 
Dr Porter was made a Member of the Order of Australia (AM) in the 2018 Queen's Birthday Honours.

Works

See also
Andrea O'Reilly
MIRCI

References 

1938 births
Living people
Members of the Order of Australia
University of Queensland alumni
Australian writers
Australian women writers